Phallostethinae is a subfamily of fishes, one of two subfamilies in the family Phallostethidae, the priapumfishes. The species in this subfamily are characterised mainly by having highly protrusible jaws. The genus Neostethus appears to be the sister taxon to the other two genera in the subfamily. The species in the Phallostethinae are found in south-east Asia, the Malay Archipelago and the Philippines.

Genera
The following three genera are classified in the subfamily Phallostethinae:

 Neostethus Regan, 1916
 Phallostethus Regan, 1913
 Phenacostethus Myers, 1928

References

 
Phallostethidae
Fish subfamilies